KLXF (90.5 FM) is a non-commercial educational radio station licensed to serve Modesto, California. Formerly a full-time satellite of KARM in Visalia, the station is now the Modesto, CA affiliate of EMF's K-Love Christian Music network.  It was previously owned by Central Valley Christian Academy, a Seventh-Day Adventist institution, but was operated by KARM owner Harvest Broadcasting under a local marketing agreement.

History
This station received its original construction permit from the Federal Communications Commission on July 6, 1987. The new station was assigned the KADV call sign by the FCC on August 26, 1987. KADV received its license to cover from the FCC on June 6, 1989.

KADV aired a religious radio format.  However, in 2011, due to financial concerns, Central Valley Christian Academy agreed to turn over KADV's operations to KARM, which is also owned by Adventist interests, under an LMA.

On November 18, 2016, Central Valley Christian Academy sold KADV to Educational Media Foundation for $225,000. On November 22, 2016, KADV changed their call letters to KLXF and on December 1, changed their format to EMF's K-Love contemporary Christian format.

References

External links
KLXF official website

Mass media in Stanislaus County, California
Radio stations established in 1989
1989 establishments in California
K-Love radio stations
Educational Media Foundation radio stations
LXF
Modesto, California